Hammersmith Police Station  is a Grade II listed police station in Hammersmith in the London Borough of Hammersmith and Fulham.

History 
It was built in 1939 to the designs of Donald McMorran, of Farquharson and McMorran.

The station closed in late 2016 for redevelopment to create an expanded facility, including improved horse stables, new custody cells and underground parking. It reopened in October 2020.

References

External links 

 Information about Hammersmith Police Station from Historic England

Grade II listed buildings in the London Borough of Hammersmith and Fulham
Grade II listed government buildings
Police stations in London